On Virtue is a Socratic dialogue attributed to Plato, but which is considered spurious. In the short dialogue, Socrates discusses with a friend questions about whether virtue can be taught. To answer this question, the author of the dialogue does little more than copy out a few passages from the Meno almost word for word.

References

External links 
On Virtue translated by George Burges
Free public domain audiobook version of On Virtue translated by George Burges
 . Collection includes On Virtue. George Burges, translator (1855).

Dialogues of Plato
Virtue